Spider is a 2019 Chilean political thriller film directed by Andrés Wood. It was screened in the Contemporary World Cinema section at the 2019 Toronto International Film Festival. It was selected as the Chilean entry for the Best International Feature Film at the 92nd Academy Awards, but it was not nominated.

Plot
Inés (22), along with her husband Justo (28) and their best friend, Gerardo (23), are members of Fatherland and Liberty, a Chilean far-right paramilitary group of nationalist and neo-fascist ideology supported by the CIA, that performed multiple terrorist acts in the early 1970s in order to overthrow the leftist government of Popular Unity and Salvador Allende.

In the heat of this fight they are involved in a risky and passionate love triangle. Together they commit a political crime that changes the country's history and incidentally involves them in a great betrayal that separates them forever.

Forty years later, Gerardo reappears. Not only does revenge inspire him, but also his youth's obsession to revive the nationalist cause, now focused on street crime and Haitian immigration. The police surprise him with an arsenal of war in his house. Inés, today a powerful and influential businesswoman, will do what is in her hands so that Gerardo does not disclose her past or her husband's.

Cast
 María Valverde as Young Inés
 Mercedes Morán as Inés
 Marcelo Alonso as Gerardo
 Pedro Fontaine as young Gerardo
 Felipe Armas as Justo
 Gabriel Urzúa as young Justo
 María Gracia Omegna as Nadia
 Mario Horton as José
 Benjamin Westfall as Doctor Sepulveda
 Jaime Vadell as Don Ricardo
 Caio Blat as Antonio
 Martín Salcedo as José's brother

See also
 List of submissions to the 92nd Academy Awards for Best International Feature Film
 List of Chilean submissions for the Academy Award for Best International Feature Film

References

External links
 

2019 films
2019 thriller films
Chilean thriller films
2010s Spanish-language films
Films about the Chilean military dictatorship
Films directed by Andrés Wood
2010s Chilean films